Melville Island (Inuktitut: ᐃᓗᓪᓕᖅ, Ilulliq) is an uninhabited member of the Queen Elizabeth Islands of the Arctic Archipelago.

There are two subnational pene-exclaves that lie west of the 110th meridian and form part of the Northwest Territories. These can only be reached by land from Nunavut or boat from the Northwest Territories.

Melville Island is shared by the Northwest Territories, which is responsible for the western half of the island, and Nunavut, which is responsible for the eastern half.  The border runs along the 110th meridian west.

Geography 
The island is located between Prince Patrick Island in the northwest, Eglinton Island in the west, and Byam Martin Island in the east. Across Viscount Melville Sound in the south lies Victoria Island.

The island has little or no vegetation.  Where continuous vegetation occurs, it usually consists of hummocks of mosses, lichens, grasses, and sedges.  The only woody species, the dwarf willow, grows as a dense twisted mat crawling along the ground.

Ibbett Bay is a fjord on the western side of the island, running approximately 55 km long.

Fauna 
A diverse animal population exists: polar bear, Peary caribou, muskox, northern collared lemming, Arctic wolf, Arctic fox, Arctic hare, and ermine (stoat) are common.  A 2003 sighting of a grizzly bear and grizzly tracks by an expedition from the University of Alberta represent the most northerly reports of grizzly bears ever recorded.

Melville Island is one of two major breeding grounds for the brant goose.  DNA analysis and field observations suggest that these birds may be distinct from other brant stocks.  Numbering 4,000–8,000 birds, this could be one of the rarest goose stocks in the world.

History 
The first documented European to visit Melville Island was the British explorer, Sir William Parry, in 1819.  He was forced to spend the winter at what is now called "Winter Harbour," until 1 August 1820, owing to freeze-up of the sea.

The island is named for Robert Dundas, 2nd Viscount Melville, who was First Sea Lord at the time.  In the search for Franklin's lost expedition, its east coast was explored as far as Bradford Point by Abraham Bradford in 1851, while its north and west coasts were surveyed by Francis Leopold McClintock, Richard Vesey Hamilton, and George Henry Richards in 1853.

On January 30, 1920, The Pioche Record reported that Icelandic explorer Vilhjalmur Stefansson discovered a lost cache from the 1853  McClintock expedition on Melville Island. Clothing and food from the cache was in excellent condition despite the harsh arctic conditions.

Fossil fuel deposits 
Melville has surfaced as a candidate for natural gas deposits. The island was believed to have deposits of coal and oil shale since the first half of the 20th century. The first Canadian Arctic island exploratory well was spudded in 1961 at Winter Harbour.

In the 1970s, the northern portion of the island on the east side of the Sabine Peninsula proved to contain a major gas field, known as Drake Point. The lease was owned by Panarctic Oils, a joint operation with the Canadian Government.

See also 

 Desert island
 List of islands

Footnotes

Further reading 

 Arctic Pilot Project (Canada), Environmental Statement: Melville Island Components, Calgary: Arctic Pilot Project, 1979
 Barnett, D.; et al. Terrain Characterization and Evaluation An Example from Eastern Melville Island, Paper (Geological Survey of Canada), 76–23, Ottawa: Energy, Mines and Resources Canada, 1977, 
 Buchanan, R.; et al. Survey of the Marine Environment of Bridport Inlet, Melville Island, Calgary: Pallister Resource Management Ltd, 1980
 Christie, R.; et al. eds. The Geology of Melville Island, Arctic Canada, Ottawa: Geological Survey of Canada, 1994, 
 Spector, A.; et al. A Gravity Survey of the Melville Island Ice Caps, Canada Dominion Observatory Contributions, 07:7, 1967
 Hodgson, D. Quaternary Geology of Western Melville Island, Northwest Territories, Ottawa: Geological Survey of Canada, 1992, 
 Hotzel, C. Terrain Disturbance on the Christopher Formation, Melville Island, NWT, Ottawa: Carleton University, Dept. of Geography, 1973
 McGregor, D.; et al. Middle Devonian Miospores from the Cape De Bray, Weatherall, and Hecla Bay Formations of Northeastern Melville Island, Canadian Arctic, Ottawa: Energy, Mines and Resources Canada, 1982, 
 Shea, I.; et al. Deadman's Melville Island & Its Burial Ground, Tantallon: Glen Margaret Pub, 2005, 
 Shearer, D. Modern and Early Holocene Arctic Deltas, Melville Island, N.W.T., Canada, s.l.: s.n., 1974
 Steen, O.; et al. Landscape Survey Eastern Melville Island, N.W.T, Calgary: R.M. Hardy & Associates, 1978
 Thomas, D.; et al. Range types and their relative use by Peary caribou and muskoxen on Melville Island, NWT, Edmonton: Environment Canada, Canadian Wildlife Service, 1999
 Trettin, H.; et al. Lower Triassic Tar Sands of Northwestern Melville Island, Arctic Archipelago, Ottawa: Dept. of Energy, Mines and Resources, 1966

External links 
 Melville Island in the Atlas of Canada - Toporama; Natural Resources Canada
 Salt Dome "Craters" on Melville Island at NASA Earth Observatory
 Environment Canada Field Projects: Geese and Swans

Borders of Nunavut
Borders of the Northwest Territories
Islands of the Queen Elizabeth Islands
Uninhabited islands of Qikiqtaaluk Region